Evan Blake Smith (formerly Dietrich-Smith; born July 19, 1986) is a former American football center. He has played for the Green Bay Packers, Seattle Seahawks, and Tampa Bay Buccaneers. As a member of the Packers, he won Super Bowl XLV against the Pittsburgh Steelers. He played college football at Idaho State University.

Early life
Smith grew up in Salinas, California. He attended and played high school football at Salinas High School. He also attended Buena Vista Middle School.

Professional career

Green Bay Packers
He was signed by the Packers as an undrafted free agent in 2009 but was waived in the last round of cuts after training camp in 2010.

Seattle Seahawks
On September 5, 2010, he was signed by the Seattle Seahawks before being released on October 5, 2010.

Second stint with the Green Bay Packers
On December 31, 2010, he re-signed with the Green Bay Packers. He got his only championship ring when the Packers defeated the Pittsburgh Steelers in Super Bowl XLV.

During the 2011 Thanksgiving Classic game between the Packers and the Detroit Lions, Smith was stomped on by Lions defensive tackle, Ndamukong Suh. Suh was ejected from the game and served a two-game suspension. Former Green Bay Packer Matt Brock claims that Smith and another Packer linemen kept untying Suh's shoes and that is what led to the stomping incident.

Tampa Bay Buccaneers
Smith signed with the Tampa Bay Buccaneers on March 14, 2014.

On March 23, 2018, Smith re-signed with the Buccaneers on a two-year contract. He was placed on injured reserve on November 13, 2018 with a hip injury.

Smith was released by the Buccaneers on August 10, 2019.

References

External links

 Tampa Bay Buccaneers bio 
 Green Bay Packers bio

1986 births
Living people
Sportspeople from Salinas, California
Players of American football from California
American football offensive tackles
American football centers
Idaho State Bengals football players
Green Bay Packers players
Seattle Seahawks players
Tampa Bay Buccaneers players
Idaho State University alumni